Desulfacinum infernum is a thermophilic sulfate-reducing bacterium, the type species of its genus. Its cells are oval, 1.5 by 2.5-3μm, non-motile and gram-negative.

References

Further reading
Barton, Larry L., and W. Allan Hamilton, eds. Sulphate-reducing bacteria: Environmental and engineered systems. Cambridge University Press, 2007.
Vos, P., et al. "Bergey’s Manual of Systematic Bacteriology, Volume 3: The Firmicutes." (2009).

External links

LPSN
Type strain of Desulfacinum infernum at BacDive -  the Bacterial Diversity Metadatabase

Thermodesulfobacteriota
Bacteria described in 1995